The perper (plural перпери) was the currency of Montenegro between 1906 and 1918. It was named the same as the medieval Serbian Empire official currency, and it was divided into 100 para.

At the end of the 20th century, Montenegro contemplated issuing the perper again. However, it decided to unofficially adopt the Deutsche mark instead, and later followed the change to the euro.

Coins

In 1906, coins were issued in denominations of 1, 2, 10 and 20 para. The 1 and 2 para were bronze, the 10 and 20 para were nickel. The nickel and copper coins were minted in Vienna. In 1909, silver 1 and 5 perpera coins were added, followed by 2 perpera in 1910. Gold 10 and 20 perpera were also issued in 1910, along with very limited numbers of 100 perpera coins. Bronze, nickel, and silver coins were issued several times until 1914.

In 1909, simultaneously with the decision to issue silver coins, minting gold Montenegrin coins was also being planned. However, due to tight relations with Austro-Hungary, gold coins were issued one year later than silver ones.

In 1910, Montenegro issued two series of gold 10, 20, and 100 perpera coins. The inscription on the first ones reads Principality of Montenegro while the second one mentions the Kingdom of Montenegro. This is due to the fact that on 28 August 1910, Prince Nicholas of Montenegro proclaimed the Kingdom of Montenegro. The second issue also commemorates his 50th anniversary of reign. Due to historical circumstances, these were the only golden perper issues in the history of Montenegro.

Today, the 100 perper coins are considered to be the finest examples of Montenegrin coinage. It is not known how many 100 perper coins have been preserved but numismatists generally agree that around 150 specimens still exist, including those stored in the museum collections of the Hermitage, the American Numismatic Society, the British Museum, the Prada and the Vienna Canton. Several are believed to be kept in private collections in Montenegro while two gold 100 perper coins adorn the collection of the Central Bank of Montenegro. At auctions, these coins reach a value of 20 to 35 thousand euros, depending on their condition.

Banknotes
Banknotes were issued in 1912 by the treasury in denominations of 1, 2, 5, 10, 50 and 100 perpera. In 1914, the government issued three series of notes, in denominations of 1, 2, 5, 10, 20, 50 and 100 perpera. During the Austrian occupation during World War I, government notes of the second and third series were overprinted by the military government district commands. In 1917, the Austrian army issued convertible vouchers denominated in perpera, perpera coins (Münzperper) and Kronen, with 2 perpera = 1 coin perper = 1 Krone.

See also 

 Hyperpyron, Byzantine coin
 Montenegrin perun, the currency that was planned for introduction in Montenegro by Petar II Petrović Njegoš in 1851
 Ragusan perpera, currency of the historical Republic of Ragusa
 Serbian perper under Tsar Dusan

References

20th century in Montenegro
Modern obsolete currencies
Currencies of Europe
1906 establishments in Montenegro
1918 disestablishments
Currencies of Montenegro
Kingdom of Montenegro